Jalan Sungai Pusu (Selangor state route B38) is a major road in Klang Valley region, Selangor, Malaysia

List of junctions

Roads in Selangor